Nita Bahtiri (born 26 February 1993 in Pristina, Kosovo, Yugoslavia) is a Kosovar singer and pianist. She rose to fame after taking part in the first season of The Voice of Albania. After the show, she took part in Top Fest twice, in 2012 and 2013.

Biography
Bahtiri was born to Kosovo Albanian parents. She finished the Prenkë Jakova musical high school and continued her piano studies at the Academy of Arts in the University of Pristina.  At the age of 18, she signed up for The Voice of Albania. She performed "Angel" by Sarah McLachlan in the "Blind Auditions" together with her piano. She received a positive feedback from all the four judges, and chose Elton Deda as her mentor. She made it through the live shows, and finished fourth in her team.

After the show, she took part in the 9th edition of Top Fest with "Një shpirt" but failed to make it to the proceeding stages of the show. The following year, she returned with "Zemër e drynosur" and made it to the semi-finals.

Discography

Singles
 2012 – "Një shpirt" (One soul)
 2013 – "Zemër e drynosur" (Locked heart)

Annotations

References

Living people
1993 births
Kosovan women singers
Kosovo Albanians
Musicians from Pristina
University of Pristina alumni
The Voice (franchise) contestants